Tanhaji: The Unsung Warrior is a 2020 Indian historical action film, co-written and directed by Om Raut and produced by Bhushan Kumar, Krishan Kumar and Ajay Devgn under T-Series Films and Ajay Devgn FFilms. Tracing the life of Maratha warrior Tanaji Malusare, it stars Ajay Devgn as the eponymous lead, Kajol and Saif Ali Khan. It also features Neha Sharma, Sharad Kelkar and Luke Kenny in supporting roles. Set in the 17th century, it revolves around Tanaji's attempts to recapture the Kondhana fortress once it passes on to Mughal emperor Aurangzeb who transfers its control to his trusted guard Udaybhan Singh Rathore.

The film was originally named Tanaji: The Unsung Warrior but the name was later changed to Tanhaji.

The film was launched on 20 July 2017, with Raut making his directorial debut in Bollywood. Raut, who previously directed Lokmanya: Ek Yug Purush (2015), for which he received acclaim, the film was simultaneously dubbed in Marathi following popular demand. Principal photography commenced on 25 September 2018, and completed within May 2019. Filming took in mostly across the Film City in Mumbai, and few scenes shot at Pune. The cinematography and editing were handled by Keiko Nakahara and Dharmendra Sharma. The background score was composed by Sandeep Shirodkar; the soundtrack album was composed by Ajay–Atul, Sachet–Parampara and Mehul Vyas and released under the label T-Series.

Tanhaji was released in India in 3D and conventional formats on 10 January 2020. The film received positive reviews, with praise for Devgn and Khan's performances, the visual effects, cinematography, action sequences, art direction, music, score, and editing. The film grossed  worldwide & was declared a major success at the box office, thus becoming the highest grossing Hindi film of 2020 as well as highest grossing Indian film of 2020. It became the 28th highest grossing Indian film of all time. The film was selected as one of the Best Foreign Film to be screened at the 78th Golden Globe Awards. At the 68th National Film Awards, the film won the awards for Best Popular Film Providing Wholesome Entertainment, Best Actor (Devgn) and Best Costume Design. At the 66th Filmfare Awards, Tanhaji received 13 nominations, including Best Film and Best Actor (Devgn), and won 4 awards, including Best Director (Raut) and Best Supporting Actor (Khan).

Plot
In 1647, Tanhaji's father, Kaloji Malusare, trains him in sword-fighting, only to succumb to a Mughal plunder in Umrat. 17 years later in 1664, a now-adult Tanhaji, with his younger brother Suryaji, commands Chhatrapati Shivaji Maharaj's Maratha army to attack an intruding Mughal cavalry.

In 1665, the Mughal Emperor, Aurangzeb, dispatches one of his most-trusted generals, Maharaja of Amber, Jai Singh, to capture Shivaji, which will stop his rapid imperial expansion into the Deccan Plateau. He successfully captures Shivaji, alongside his 23 forts that are under his control, in the Battle of Purandar. Later the Mughal general, Beshak Khan, orders a quick seize of Shivaji's strategic fortress, Kondhana, insulting Jijabai, Shivaji's mother. She swears to remain barefoot until the Marathas recapture the fort. Tanhaji is informed about the treaty as well. Five years later, in 1670, Shivaji's spy informs him about Aurangzeb's plan to assign Kondhana to his Rajput general, Udaybhan Rathod, and use it as a base for Aurangzeb's southern imperial expansion. Shivaji plans to recapture Kondhana, considering himself to lead the campaign as Tanhaji, though an able general, cannot be employed due to his son, Rayba's upcoming wedding. 

Meanwhile, Tanhaji celebrates Holi with his family. The Marathas begin their preparations for war and Shivaji warns his generals to keep Tanhaji from knowing about the campaign. Tanhaji arrives at Rajgad, to invite Shivaji and Jijabai to Rayba's wedding. Chandraji Pisal, a Maratha general, who is attempting to usurp Shivaji's throne, discloses the secret plan to Tanhaji at his nephew, Chultya's recommendation. Tanhaji convinces Shivaji and Jijabai to permit him to lead the campaign, who reluctantly agree. He postpones Rayba's wedding.

Elsewhere, Udaybhan reaches Burhanpur, while the Marathas discuss the possibilities of his route. Tanhaji coins an attack plan, but Pisal sends Chultya to warn Udaybhan about the plan. Pisal schemes of sabotaging Tanhaji's mission and getting him killed, so that Shivaji would then appoint him in-charge of the campaign. Pisal intends to become influential enough to overthrow Shivaji and join hands with Udaybhan. Udaybhan is also bringing the imprisoned Kamla Devi, en-route, the sister of his Rajput general, Jagat Singh. Chultya informs Udaybhan about Tanhaji's plan. He successfully tricks Tanhaji into attacking Maratha soldiers disguised in Mughal attire. Elsewhere, Udaybhan reaches Kondhana and aims a huge cannon, named Naagin, at Rajgad, threatening Shivaji's safety. Dejected, Tanhaji reaches Kondhana alone to learn about a secret thief-entrance inside. Udaybhan kills a guard for disobeying the security protocol. Tanhaji recovers the remains of the guard and motivates the villagers to retaliate against Udaybhan. 

He is invited to participate in Shivratri celebrations, on Kondhana, where he kills Chultya for betraying the Marathas. Tanhaji is imprisoned and tortured by Udaybhan, as a result. Jagat Singh secretly releases Tanhaji, revealing Udaybhan's plan to marry his sister. Tanhaji promises to release them from Udaybhan's clutches. Tanhaji escapes from the thief-entrance and returns to Umrat where he informs his people about the upcoming war. Savitri Bai, Tanhaji's wife, worries about her husband's life and son's impending wedding. Tanhaji convinces Savitri Bai that the campaign will be a success for the Marathas, to which she replies by asking him what he wants from her, when he returns from the campaign. Tanhaji makes Savitri Bai promise to him that she will don Maratha bridal attire, while waiting for him.

Udaybhan hangs the guards responsible for Tanhaji's escape and Jagat Singh agrees to get Kamla Devi married to him, on Ashtami's eve. He convinces her to fake the wedding preparations until Tanhaji and his army arrive. Tanhaji now plans to directly attack Kondhana during Ashtami night on 4 February 1670. He scales the fort through various entrances and begins the attack on the Mughal army. The ensuing confusion allows Jagat and Kamla Devi to escape. Udaybhan is alerted, who prepares to fire Naagin directly at Rajgad. 

Tanhaji and his army wipe out most of the Mughal soldiers. Just as Udhaybhan lights Naagin, Tanhaji arrives on horseback to stop the cannon from being fired. Though successful, Udhaybhan hacks off Tanhaji's arm in the process, gravely injuring him. With his remaining strength, Tanhaji fights Udhaybhan to death. It culminates with Tanhaji tying Udhaybhan to Naagin and pushing it off a cliff, ending Udhaybhan's brief reign. Before collapsing from his injuries, he plants the flag of the Marathas, successfully capturing Kondhana. Shivaji and his army arrive and conquer Kondhana, but Shivaji ends up breaking into tears over Tanhaji's death, uttering "Gad Aala, Pan Sinh Gela" (the fort has been captured, but we lost the lion). Later, Shivaji personally oversees Rayba's marriage, while Savitri Bai fulfill's her promise to Tanhaji by adorning herself as a bride behind closed doors, as she awaits his return. Aurangzeb's aim of ruling southern India remained unfilled for 18 years, until he himself came to try to claim it from the Marathas.

Cast

Production

Development 
After completing his work on the directorial venture Shivaay (2016), Ajay Devgn, announced his next film on 29 July 2016, titled Sons of Sardaar: Battle of Saragarhi, a big-budget war film based on the 1897 Saragarhi battle between 21 Sikhs and 10,000 Afghans. Made on a huge scale, Devgn planned to start the production work in late 2016, and decided to release the film on Diwali next year; However, when Karan Johar announced Kesari, another film based on the battle of Saragarhi, Devgn decided to postpone the project after September 2017. In late February 2019, it was reported that Devgn had shelved the project.

Meanwhile, Ajay Devgn, decided to do another period film with Om Raut, based on the life of Maratha warrior Tanaji Malusare, which was titled officially as Taanaji: The Unsung Warrior. The first look of Taanaji was released on 20 July 2017, through Devgn's official Twitter account, and pre-production work commenced the following day. In August 2017, a report from Asian Age, claimed that the film will also be made simultaneously in Marathi language, due to the demand of the story, and also Raut's popularity in Marathi, after the success of Lokmanya: Ek Yug Purush (2015).

A source claimed that the film's pre-production work will go on for 6–8 months, and Ajay Devgn will start the shoot of the film in March 2018. However, the team undertook heavy VFX works for the film for 6–8 months, and Devgn's NY VFXWAALA was brought on board for the film, whereas filmmakers planned to release the film in 3D formats, thus delaying the film's shoot to September 2018. On 2 August 2018, Bhushan Kumar of T-Series, undertook the project in collaboration with Ajay Devgn's production company and planned to start the shoot in end of September. In March 2019, the film's title Taanaji: The Unsung Warrior was changed to Tanhaji, due to numerological reasons.

Casting 
In October 2018, Kajol was reported to play the role of Taanaji's wife in the film. In January 2019, Saif Ali Khan was reported to play the role of Udaybhan Singh Rathore, one of the main antagonists of the film. For his role, Khan had to prepare for sword fighting and horse-riding, as a part of the character, In an interview with Mid-Day, he stated "A chunk of the research has been done by Om, who has done a thorough job. Since it is an action-packed film, I was required to look leaner. I had to be adept in horse riding. The fact that I was coming straight off Navdeep's [Singh] film (Laal Kaptaan) made it easier. The physical prep has been rigorous for this film." Devgn and Khan had previously collaborated in Vishal Bharadwaj's Omkara (2004).

Filming 
Principal photography began on 25 September 2018, with a mahurat shot given by Om Raut. The film's first schedule was commenced in October 2018, with Kajol filming her portions in Mumbai.

Tanhaji was filmed mainly at the Film City in Mumbai. Director Om Raut claimed that in the movie, the visual effects have played a major part. The director also said that making the Sandhan Valley set was the biggest challenge for them. The makers had to create a big 300 feet long set to make it look like the Sandhan Valley. In the making video of the film, Raut stated: "Creating the 300-foot long gorge inside a theatre was extremely difficult," adding that the production designers "went and took moulds of the stones and rocks which are there in the valley and they built a wall. And what we did in the effects after that is we put in effects on it."

The team of the film also shot some parts at Chitrakoot Ground in Andheri. Some parts of the film were also filmed at Pune. In January 2019, the team kicked off a song shoot which has been mounted on a lavish scale and that a special set was erected for this number. Kajol, however, shot for this number last year, in the last week of December. As the song was so elaborate that the shooting schedule for the same was as long as a week and the number will feature some amazing diya and rangoli setup representing that era. Keeping in the mind the period that the film is set up in, Kajol sported wearing a traditional Maharashtrian outfit in the song.

In March 2019, a source claimed that 60% of the shoot was completed, and the team took a break, after Devgn being busy for the promotions of his film Total Dhamaal (2019). In April 2019, a climax shoot featuring Devgn and Khan was filmed in a huge scale, and the stunt sequence was choreographed by Ramazan Bulut, who worked in the stunt department for Hollywood films Rush (2013) and Inferno (2016). The principal photography wrapped up in May 2019.

Soundtrack

The film's soundtrack album was composed by Ajay–Atul, Sachet–Parampara Mehul Vyas and Prasenjit Kosambi with lyrics written by Swanand Kirkire Anil Verma and Abhijit Kosambi. The background score of the film is composed by Sandeep Shirodkar. The album features four tracks with vocals by Mehul Vyas, Adarsh Shinde, Sukhwinder Singh, Shreya Ghoshal, Sachet Tandon, Parampara Thakur, Ganesh Chandanshive,Harshdeep Kaur and  Prasenjit Kosambi. It was released on 20 December 2019 by T-Series. The soundtrack album for the Marathi version had reused the same set of vocals, excluding for some songs, whose vocals were provided by Avadhoot Gupte and Kirti Killedar.

Debarati Sen of The Times of India, writing for the soundtrack album in her review, praised "Maay Bhavani" stating "Ajay-Atul has excelled in the beautiful merging of different tempos, and deftly woven in the varied nuances of classical and folk in one single package." Vipin Nair, in his review for The Hindu, stated "With three hummable numbers, the film’s music is enjoyable but nothing out of the ordinary." Joginder Tuteja of Bollywood Hungama reviewed "The soundtrack of Tanhaji – The Unsung Warrior delivers as expected. Though there aren't many memorable songs out there, they do well enough to keep the film's narrative engaging."

Marketing and release 
Tanhaji, considered to be one of the most anticipated Hindi films of the year, was initially scheduled to release on 29 November 2019, post-Diwali, but the release was postponed to the necessity of VFX works in a large scale needed for the film. On 28 March 2019, the makers rescheduled the release date to 10 January 2020.

Prior to the release of the film, the Sambhaji Brigade faced objection of some scenes from the trailer which released in November 2019. In a letter, written to the crew members, dated 20 November 2019, the organization has alleged that the film has intentionally tried to erase Shivaji Maharaj's secular image. They had also taken objection to the dialogues of Kajol who plays the role of Savitribai Malusare. The organization has also demanded a special screening of the film ahead of its release. Later, Nationalist Congress Party leader Jitendra Ahwad, threatened the makers of the film to make several changes to the trailer of the film, also accused filmmaker Om Raut of depicting history inaccurately and unethically and showing the Maratha warrior Tanaji Malusare in a wrong way. The Akhil Bhartiya Kshatriya Koli Rajput Sangh has filed a petition in Delhi High Court on 13 December 2019, claiming that its director Raut, has concealed the true lineage of the great warrior Tanaji Malusare in the movie. In January 2020, the Central Board of Film Certification deleted controversial references in the film, and ensured multiple disclaimers in the beginning to avoid controversies.

Tanhaji opened up to 4,540 screens worldwide, which included 3,880 screens in 3D and conventional formats in Hindi and Marathi versions and 660 screens overseas. A day before its release, the makers premiered a special screening of the film on 9 January, featuring Devgn and his family, along with the cast and crew. Later on 13 January, Devgn hosted special screening of the film, for 600 school children at the Inox Megaplex in Mumbai, to know about the history of Tanaji Malusare. Another special screening was held on 20 January for the army and navy officials. The Maharashtra Tourism Development Corporation has tied up an association with the Directorate of Tourism and the film's team to attract tourists to know about the history of Tanaji Malusare and its legacy. The film was declared tax-free in Uttar Pradesh, Haryana and Maharashtra.  This film was also released dubbed in Marathi-language following popular demand.

Tanhaji's world television premiere took place on 26 July 2020 at Star Plus, and registered 1.2 crore impressions on its first airing. The film released on Disney+ Hotstar on 6 March 2020.

Reception

Box office
Tanhaji earned  at the domestic box office on its opening day. On the second day, the film collected . On the third day, the film collected  , taking total opening weekend collection to ₹619.3 million . At the end of the first week (16 January), the film collected . The film collected , on the eighth day of its release, with a strong opening on the second Friday.

The film crossed the 150 crore mark on the tenth day of its release. On 3 February, the film collected  at the box office. At the end of its seventh week, the film collected . The film managed to earn , at the domestic box office, within 50 days of its release. As of 13 March 2020, with theatres closure due to the COVID-19 pandemic, the film had accumulated , in India and  overseas, thus collecting  worldwide, it became the highest-grossing Bollywood film of 2020.

Critical response 

A review over the Hindustan Times noted it to be a magnificent work, which had exceptional individual performances, a captivating story-line and excellent virtual effects. Namrata Joshi of The Hindu noted of the film to have started off well, before floundering in the middle but regaining brilliance at the end, delivering a catharsis and adrenaline rush. Uday Bhatia of The Mint noted it to be a silly cartoon history, which borrowed its physics from Prince of Persia, but nonetheless consisted of fluent actions and interesting individual performances. Saibal Chatterjee of NDTV noted it to be a historically inauthentic work that ironed out any and all nuances in its portrayal of a saffronized Hindu-Muslim binary; however, he noted the overall production to be crisp and backed by powerful individual performances. Tanul Thakur of The Wire noted it to be a work that had excellent cinematography but was intensely buoyed down by its ahistorical religio-nationalist propaganda, catering to the overall saffronization of India.

Shubhra Gupta over The Indian Express noted it to offer a "simplistic, dressed-up slice of the past" that painted hyperbolic tales of Maratha bravery with a Hindu fervor. Sukanya Verma of Rediff noted it to be a mythical retelling of history with a bout of saffron fervor; individual performances and choreography of combat sequences were praised. Rajeev Masand noted it to be a dubiously stereotyped fictional work, which appealed to the hyper-nationalistic climate but had robust filmography, visceral battle scenes, and superb individual performances. A critic from The Economic Times praised the visual effects, computer graphics and editing of the film, making it a must-watch film. Stutee Ghosh of The Quint noted it to be a visually stunning film with strong individual performances, despite its broad liberties with historical accuracy and problematic prejudices. Jyoti Kanyal of India Today gave two-and-a-half out of five stars stating "Tanhaji: The Unsung Warrior is an exaggerated and slow-paced ode to the great Maratha warrior Tanaji Malusare."

Writing for the Firstpost, Devanesh Sharma gave two-and-a-half out of five stars and praised Kajol and Khan's performance while criticizing Devgn's characterization as the review stated "The leading man, though undoubtedly an unsung warrior, as the title suggests, comes across as rather one-dimensional, as Devgn fails to take his character beyond the written word." Harshada Rege of The Times of India gave four out of five stars and stated "Tanhaji: The Unsung Warrior scores on various counts – superior performances, powerful action, visual impact, and most of all, it unfolds a story from the pages of history that deserved to be told, with just this kind of intensity, passion and vigor." Sify gave the film 3 out of 5 stars stating "Tanhaji is substantially enriched by its technical crew that has worked to create a splendid canvas for the cast to shine upon. It tells the story of a lesser known hero from the chapters of Indian history, which makes this an intriguing film."

Monika Rawal Kukreja of Hindustan Times wrote in her review stating "Tanhaji is a complete package. It’s magnificent, high on visual effects and has powerful action backed by rock solid performances." Rohit Vats of News18 gave three-and-a-half out of five stars stating "Devgn and Khan ensure that the viewers get enough dose of high-voltage dialogues, along with fascinating action scenes." Nandini Ramnath of Scroll stated "Tanhaji loudly sings its hero’s praises, creating a spectacle that is thrilling when in battle mode and troubling when considering the dynamic between the Marathas and the Mughals."

Avinash Ramachandran of The New Indian Express gave three out of five stars stating "In Tanhaji: The Unsung Warrior, we get to see iconic warriors of India shed tears copiously. We get to see jingoism masked as Maratha valor. There are a lot of things going for Tanhaji, but, deep inside, it is unsettling to see such polarizing historical dramas." A critic from Bollywood Hungama rated four out of five stars and stated Tanhaji is an entertaining and a paisa-vasool film that would be loved by the masses as well as classes. Suparna Sharma of Deccan Chronicle gave three out of five stars stating "Tanhaji: The Unsung Warrior, whose plot is essentially a march towards the battle, is not a bad film. It is, in fact, quite entertaining when it is at war." A critic from Daily News and Analysis gave three out of five stars stating "Watch it for the magnificent performances by Kajol and Khan who clearly outshine this Devgn-led vehicle."

Historical accuracy 
"Ek Marata Lakh Maratha" is a slogan of Maratha Kranti Morcha movement, this movement is for reservation for Maratha cast, but Om Raut and Ajay Devgan used it in this film. Tanaji used this slogan in 17th century, It have no historical source. In one scene, Aurangzeb is shown to entertain the Shah of Iran by the name of Shah Pahlavi. The contemporary Iranian ruler of Aurangzeb was Suleiman I of the Safavid Dynasty. There was no ruler of Persia during the medieval era who was known by the name Shah Pahlavi. The Pahlavi Dynasty of Iran came to power in the 20th century that ruled for a brief time from 1925 to 1979; whereas, the Safavid Dynasty ruled Iran for more than two hundred years from the 16th to 18th century.

In the final fight against Udaybhan Rathod Tanaji lost his shield not his arm. Udaybhan was killed by Shelar Mama, not by Tanaji as shown in the film. Tanaji's brother Suryaji Malusare also fought bravely. Tanaji never threw stick at King Shivaji as depicted in this film, this incident is inaccurate and have no historical backing. Tanaji had high respect for Shivaji and it is highly unlikely that he throw something to his king. In 17th century Maratha warriors use shields made up of back of tortoise, they did not use shields made up of metals as shown in this movie. In a scene a Barber helps Udaybhan but this incident have no historical truth. Tanaji was never captured and held captive by Udaybhan Rathod as depicted in this film.

Accolades

Social impact 
Tanhaji became the highest most-rated film of the year, at a survey report by Book My Show. A report from Google Trends, stated that the film is the third most searched films of Google. The film was selected as one of the Best Foreign Film to be screened at the 78th Golden Globe Awards which was held in January 2021.

Notes

References

External links

 Tanhaji at Bollywood Hungama

2020 films
2020 3D films
2020s Hindi-language films
2020 action drama films
2020s historical drama films
Indian action drama films
Films scored by Sachet–Parampara
Films scored by Ajay–Atul
Indian biographical drama films
Indian epic films
Indian historical drama films
Indian 3D films
Biographical action films
2010s historical action films
Indian films based on actual events
Action films based on actual events
Drama films based on actual events
Epic films based on actual events
Films set in the Maratha Empire
Films set in the 1670s
T-Series (company) films
Cultural depictions of Shivaji
Cultural depictions of Aurangzeb
Indian historical action films
2010s Marathi-language films
Films directed by Om Raut